Wang Jeon may refer to:

Wonjong of Goryeo (1219–1274), born Wang Jeon, ruler of Goryeo
Gongmin of Goryeo (1330–1374), personal name Wang Jeon, ruler of Goryeo